"And the Green Grass Grew All Around", also known as "The Green Grass Grew All Around" or "And the Green Grass Grows All Around", is a traditional Appalachian folk song that was first noted in  1877  in (Miss M. H. Mason's book 'Nursery Rhymes and Country Songs' but is likely to be much older). Some sources give the author as William Jerome and melody by Harry Von Tilzer in 1912.

As a popular classic children's song today, it is an example of a cumulative song.

It is similar to the Irish folk song Rattlin' Bog and versions exist in many other cultures and under many titles. A version of the song features in the Midsomer Murders episode Small Mercies.[4]

References

American children's songs
Songs about plants
Cumulative songs
1877 songs
Songs with music by Harry Von Tilzer
Songs with lyrics by William Jerome